St Kilda is a suburb of the New Zealand city of Dunedin. A densely populated residential suburb, it lies on the southern part of the city's central plain, to the southwest of the head of the harbour and immediately north of Ocean Beach, parts of which (St Kilda Beach and Middle Beach) are within the suburb and form its major geographical feature. Saint Kilda's 2001 population was 5,904.

Geography
The suburb has fairly well-defined boundaries, having been a separate borough from 1875 until the time of local government restructuring in 1989. This borough was bounded by Forbury Road in the west, Bay View Road in the north, and Royal Crescent in the east, and at the time of its amalgamation into Dunedin City, was the most densely populated borough in New Zealand. Much of the borough's growth was between 1900 and 1930, during which time the population rose from around 1500 to 8000, slowly declining from that time to its current figure. Many of St Kilda's houses date from this period.

St Kilda was named for the Melbourne suburb by early property developer George Scott, who had arrived in New Zealand from Victoria in 1862. The area previously had the Maori name Whakaherekau.

St Kilda gave its name to a New Zealand electoral constituency which covered much of southern Dunedin and the Otago Peninsula. This electorate existed from 1946 to 1993 (after which it was replaced by the Dunedin South electorate), and was represented in turn by Fred Jones (Labour, 1946–1951), Sir James Barnes (National, 1951–1957), Bill Fraser, (Labour, 1957–1981), and Michael Cullen (Labour, 1981–1993).

St Kilda is surrounded by the suburbs of St Clair, Forbury, Caversham, South Dunedin, Musselburgh and Tainui. Other major streets in St Kilda include Prince Albert Road in the east (which contains most of the suburb's few shops), Queens Drive, Richardson Street and Victoria Road, the last of which runs along the southern shore, separated from the Pacific Ocean by wide high dunes. The Sir James Barnes Lookout is located close to the highest point of the dunes and commands views across the plain on which Saint Kilda lies and the surrounding parts of the city.

Infrastructure and community
The streets of St Kilda form a grid pattern which is interrupted by a long crescent (Hargest Crescent), which runs around the original boundary of the city's main horse racing venue, Forbury Park (the park was reduced to its current size in 1909). The suburb also contains the Dunedin Ice Stadium, an Olympic-sized ice-skating rink and several sports fields, notably De Carle Park, Marlow Park, Kettle Park, and Hancock Park. Chisholm Park Golf Course also lies partly within Saint Kilda. Saint Kilda has three pubs, a bowling green, tennis courts, and a badminton hall. Though it contains no secondary schools, the paired single-sex King's and Queen's High Schools lie close to its northern edge.

St Kilda is also the home of the St Kilda Sentinel Brass Band, Pirates Rugby Club, Otago Model Engineering Society, Ocean Beach Railway, St Kilda Surf Lifesaving Club, Hot Rod Club and Ocean Beach scout group.  Being mainly residential, there are few notable industries within the suburb, an exception being Wests, a soft drink manufacturers located in Bay View Road.

Demographics

St Kilda had a population of 5,502 at the 2018 New Zealand census, an increase of 204 people (3.9%) since the 2013 census, and an increase of 243 people (4.6%) since the 2006 census. There were 2,328 households. There were 2,586 males and 2,910 females, giving a sex ratio of 0.89 males per female, with 984 people (17.9%) aged under 15 years, 1,086 (19.7%) aged 15 to 29, 2,313 (42.0%) aged 30 to 64, and 1,119 (20.3%) aged 65 or older.

Ethnicities were 84.3% European/Pākehā, 12.0% Māori, 5.6% Pacific peoples, 7.0% Asian, and 2.9% other ethnicities (totals add to more than 100% since people could identify with multiple ethnicities).

The proportion of people born overseas was 17.6%, compared with 27.1% nationally.

Although some people objected to giving their religion, 54.2% had no religion, 33.5% were Christian, 0.8% were Hindu, 1.0% were Muslim, 0.9% were Buddhist and 2.8% had other religions.

Of those at least 15 years old, 846 (18.7%) people had a bachelor or higher degree, and 1,041 (23.0%) people had no formal qualifications. 363 people (8.0%) earned over $70,000 compared to 17.2% nationally. The employment status of those at least 15 was that 1,974 (43.7%) people were employed full-time, 600 (13.3%) were part-time, and 195 (4.3%) were unemployed.

Mayors of St Kilda Borough
St Kilda had its own mayor during its time as a borough between 1875 and 1989. The following is a list of holders.

References

Suburbs of Dunedin
1875 establishments in New Zealand